CLD-1 is a vibrant blue dye originally synthesized for application in nonlinear electro-optics.

References

Nonlinear optics
Dyes
Nitriles